Sheridan is the debut studio album by English singer and actress Sheridan Smith. It was released by East West on 3 November 2017, and debuted at number nine on the UK Albums Chart.

Details of the album were first announced in August 2017, with Smith subsequently confirming Sheridan as its title in October. To coincide with its release, she appeared in a one-off television special for ITV, also titled Sheridan, in which she chatted to comedian Alexander Armstrong and performed tracks from the album. The album received a mixed reception. Smith also announced that she would embark on a UK tour in 2018.

Background
Smith has enjoyed a prolific television and stage career, and won critical acclaim for her performances in productions such as the West End musical Legally Blonde and the television series Mrs Biggs. She also portrayed Cilla Black in a 2014 biopic made for ITV. In August 2017 it was reported that Smith had signed a record deal with East West Records to release an album. On 20 September 2017, ITV confirmed that Smith would star in a TV special later in the year. Titled Sheridan, the one-off special would feature her performing some of the songs from the album, and talking about her life. On 3 October, Smith posted an image of the album on Instagram, revealing its title. Smith subsequently appeared on the 8 October edition of the Strictly Come Dancing results show, where she performed the song "My Man" from the musical Funny Girl, which was well received by viewers.

Sheridan, a one-hour programme featuring a mix of chat and music, was aired by ITV on Sunday 5 November 2017 at 9.00pm. The show was presented by comedian Alexander Armstrong, who talked to Smith in between numbers about her life and career. At one point Smith discussed her experience of personal relationships and loss, performing an emotionally charged version of "And I Am Telling You I'm Not Going", something Jack Seale of Radio Times described as an "extraordinary moment". Generally the programme received a mixed reception, with the Coventry Telegraph describing how Smith "wowed fans with an intimate one-off TV show", while Ed Cumming of The Telegraph felt the show's format "made for uneasy viewing" as "it had the sense of a relaunch".

Following its release, the album debuted at number nine on the UK Albums Chart.

Critical reception
Giving the album seven out of ten, Kerri-Ann Roper of the Belfast Telegraph praised the album for "[adding] another impressive notch to [Smith's] many talents", singling out her version of Jennifer Hudson's "And I Am Telling You I'm Not Going" as "probably one of the most impressive songs [which] she makes her own quite easily and gently". Describing Sheridan as "an album of cover versions that veers wildly between singing styles; less like interpretation than impersonation at times", Martin Townsend of the Sunday Express gave the album two out of five. However, Townsend felt that Smith had found what he called her "own" voice, a "soft-edged croon", in her rendition of Rufus Wainwright's "Dinner at Eight".

Tour
Smith embarked on her first solo UK tour in support of the album in early 2018. The set list included both songs from the album and her career in musical theatre.

Tour dates

Track listing

Charts

Weekly charts

Year-end charts

Certifications

References

2017 debut albums
Classical albums by English artists
Sheridan Smith albums
East West Records albums